Clyde Smith is an American former Negro league third baseman who played in the 1930s.

Smith played for the Pittsburgh Crawfords in 1938. In four recorded games, he posted two hits in 14 plate appearances.

References

External links
 and Seamheads

Year of birth missing
Place of birth missing
Pittsburgh Crawfords players
Baseball third basemen